Line 3 (Italian: Linea 3) is a commuter rail service operated by the Ente Autonomo Volturno (EAV) company in the city of Naples, Italy. It connects 11 stations.

Stations

See also 
 Naples Metro
 List of suburban and commuter rail systems

References

External links 
 Urbanrail.net Naples rail website

Transport in Naples